"I'm Not Gonna Teach Your Boyfriend How to Dance with You" is a song by American indie rock band Black Kids from their debut album, Partie Traumatic (2008). It was released as the band's debut single by Almost Gold Recordings on April 7, 2008, in the United Kingdom, and on May 27, 2008, in North America. The song peaked at number 11 on the UK Singles Chart but did not chart in the United States. The demo version from the band's 2007 EP Wizard of Ahhhs placed at number 68 on Pitchfork Medias "Top 100 Tracks of 2007".

Background
According to lead singer Reggie Youngblood, the track was inspired by Jacksonville's dance party scene: he realized that usually, he would end up with girls who couldn't dance. The line "You are the girl, that I've been dreaming of, ever since I was a little girl" is based on an inside joke between Reggie and his sister Ali Youngblood where they would refer to wanting something as "Ever since I was a little girl".

Reception
In a review of Partie Traumatic on AllMusic, Tim Sendra called "I'm Not Gonna Teach Your Boyfriend How to Dance with You" one of the best songs on the album, writing that it "kick[s] you in the gut with [its] energy and verve." Commercially, the single performed well in the United Kingdom, debuting at number 84 on April 6, 2008, and rising to its peak of number 11 the following week. It became a minor hit in the Flanders region of Belgium, reaching number 10 on the Ultratip listing.

Track listings
All songs were written by Black Kids except where noted.

7-inch single (pink vinyl)
A. "I'm Not Gonna Teach Your Boyfriend How to Dance with You" – 3:39
B. "Damn I Wish I Was Your Lover"  – 2:26

UK 12-inch single (white vinyl)
A1. "I'm Not Gonna Teach Your Boyfriend How to Dance with You" – 3:39
B1. "I'm Not Gonna Teach Your Boyfriend How to Dance with You" (The Twelves Remix) – 3:46
B2. "I'm Not Gonna Teach Your Boyfriend How to Dance with You" (The Twelves Remix – Dub Version) – 3:46

CD single and EP
 "I'm Not Gonna Teach Your Boyfriend How to Dance with You" – 3:39
 "You Turn Me On"  – 2:50
 "Damn I Wish I Was Your Lover"  – 2:26

US and Canadian digital download
 "I'm Not Gonna Teach Your Boyfriend How to Dance with You" – 3:40
 "I'm Not Gonna Teach Your Boyfriend How to Dance with You" (The Twelves Remix) – 3:44

UK digital download EP
 "I'm Not Gonna Teach Your Boyfriend How to Dance with You" – 3:39
 "You Turn Me On"  – 2:50
 "Damn I Wish I Was Your Lover"  – 2:26
 "I'm Not Gonna Teach Your Boyfriend How to Dance with You" (The Twelves Remix) – 3:46

Personnel
 Owen Holmes – bass guitar
 Kevin Snow – drums
 Dawn Watley – keyboards and vocals
 Ali Youngblood – keyboards and vocals
 Reggie Youngblood – guitar and vocals

Charts

Weekly charts

Year-end charts

Release history

References

External links
 Official Black Kids website

2008 debut singles
2008 songs
Black Kids songs
Songs about dancing